Bandera Pass [elevation ] is a mountain pass in Bandera County, Texas, in the United States.

The Battle of Bandera Pass, a part of the Texas-Indian wars, took place at the pass in 1843. (Others say this battle was in 1841.)

Nearby Bandera Creek was named after Bandera Pass.

References

External links
Bandera Pass in the Handbook of Texas

Landforms of Bandera County, Texas
Mountain passes of Texas